Kenneth Franklin Richardson (May 2, 1915 – December 7, 1987) was an American professional baseball player who spent 21 seasons in minor league baseball, interrupted by two, six-game Major League trials with the Philadelphia Athletics  and Philadelphia Phillies.  He played six games for each team, collecting four hits, including one double. However, in the minors (1934–1946; 1948–1955) he played in 2,336 games, with his 2,168 hits including 222 home runs.

Born in Orleans, Indiana, Richardson threw and batted right-handed. Both of his MLB stints occurred in early-season trials; he had one single (off Charlie Wagner of the Boston Red Sox) in 15 at bats for the 1942 Athletics, and three hits (including his double off Kirby Higbe of the Brooklyn Dodgers) in 20 at bats for the 1946 Phillies.

Richardson played in the top-level Pacific Coast League for all or parts of eight seasons. In his 60s, he returned to baseball as a minor league manager in 1976 and from 1978 to 1981, spending the latter four seasons in the Milwaukee Brewers organization.

References

External links

1915 births
1987 deaths
Chattanooga Lookouts players
Des Moines Demons players
El Paso Texans players
Hollywood Stars players
Jersey City Giants players
Lewiston Broncs players
Los Angeles Angels (minor league) players
Major League Baseball outfielders
Major League Baseball second basemen
Major League Baseball third basemen
Minneapolis Millers (baseball) players
Minor league baseball managers
Moline Plowboys players
Philadelphia Athletics players
Philadelphia Phillies players
Ponca City Angels players
Riverside Rubes players
San Francisco Seals (baseball) players
Seattle Rainiers players
Spokane Indians players
Tucson Cowboys players
Vancouver Capilanos players
Williamsport Grays players
Yakima Bears players